The molecular formula C23H28O6 (molar mass: 400.46 g/mol, exact mass: 400.1886 u) may refer to:

 Enprostil
 

Molecular formulas